Puka Hirka (Quechua puka red, hirka mountain, "red mountain", Hispanicized spelling Puca Jirca) is a mountain in the Cordillera Blanca in the Andes of Peru, about  high. It is situated in the Ancash Region, Bolognesi Province, Aquia District, northeast of Pastururi.

References

External links 

Mountains of Peru
Mountains of Ancash Region
Huascarán National Park